is a Japanese manga artist.

Hotta is best known as the author of the best-selling manga and anime series Hikaru no Go, which is widely credited for the late 90s-2000s boom of the game of go  in Japan. The idea behind Hikaru no Go began when Yumi Hotta played a pick-up game of go with her father-in-law. She later worked with Takeshi Obata (the illustrator) and Yukari Umezawa (5-Dan, the supervisor) in the creation of Hikaru no Go. She won the 2000 Shogakukan Manga Award and the 2003 Tezuka Osamu Cultural Prize for Hikaru no Go.

She also had a short manga series  about long track speed skating that ran in Weekly Shōnen Jump in 2005.

He was also well known as a contributor to the Chunichi Shimbun where he illustrated under the pen name .

See also 

 Go players

References 

1957 births
Female comics writers
Living people
Japanese female comics artists
Women manga artists
Manga artists from Aichi Prefecture
Japanese women writers